Arthur Claud Spencer Chichester, 4th Baron Templemore,  (12 September 1880 – 2 October 1953) was a British soldier and politician of Anglo-Irish descent.

Biography
Chichester was the eldest son of the 3rd Baron Templemore and his wife, Evelyn (née Stracey-Clitherow). He was educated at Harrow and trained at the Royal Military College, Sandhurst, before being commissioned into the Royal Fusiliers as a second lieutenant on 20 January 1900. He fought in the Second Boer War, and was promoted to lieutenant on 23 February 1901, staying in South Africa until the end of the war, when he returned home on the SS Assaye in September 1902. When he was back in the United Kingdom, he returned as a regular lieutenant in his regiment in November 1902. He later served in Mauritius, India, and the British expedition to Tibet.

By now a Captain, Chichester distinguished himself in the First World War with his service in France and Italy, becoming a Major with the Irish Guards and winning along with many other awards the DSO (1918) and an OBE (1919).

In 1924, he succeeded his father as fourth Baron Templemore, and three years later was appointed Parliamentary Private Secretary to the Earl of Onslow as Under-Secretary of State for War and Paymaster General.

Lord Templemore was a Lord in Waiting to George V from February to June, 1929 and again between 1931 and 1934. He was also Captain of the Yeomen of the Guard for 11 years (1934–1945), and served as Conservative Chief Whip in the House of Lords (1940–1945). He was appointed KCVO in 1938. He was a Deputy Lieutenant of Hampshire.

Personal life

Templemore married the Hon.Clare Meriel Wingfield, second daughter of Mervyn Wingfield, 7th Viscount Powerscourt, at St George's, Hanover Square, London, in 1911. They had three sons:

Major Hon. Arthur Patrick Spencer Chichester (23 March 1914  –  23 December 1942), killed in action in North Africa in World War II
Major Hon. Dermot Chichester (18 April 1916 – 19 April 2007)
Lord Desmond Clive Chichester, MC (1920–2000)

The fourth baron died in 1953 in County Wicklow. His second son succeeded him in the barony and in 1975 inherited the title of Marquess of Donegall in the Peerage of Ireland from a distant cousin.

References

External links

1880 births
1953 deaths
Barons in the Peerage of the United Kingdom
British Army personnel of World War I
British Army personnel of the Second Boer War
Arthur
Companions of the Distinguished Service Order
Conservative Party (UK) Baronesses- and Lords-in-Waiting
Deputy Lieutenants of Hampshire
Deputy Lieutenants of Wexford
Eldest sons of British hereditary barons
Graduates of the Royal Military College, Sandhurst
Irish Guards officers
Knights Commander of the Royal Victorian Order
Members of the Privy Council of the United Kingdom
Ministers in the Chamberlain peacetime government, 1937–1939
Ministers in the Chamberlain wartime government, 1939–1940
Ministers in the Churchill caretaker government, 1945
Ministers in the Churchill wartime government, 1940–1945
Officers of the Order of the British Empire
People educated at Harrow School
Royal Fusiliers officers